Saramthali may refer to:

Saramthali, Kavrepalanchok, Nepal
Saramthali, Rasuwa, Nepal